The Toscano Family Ice Forum is a ice hockey arena on the campus of the University of Connecticut. in Storrs, Connecticut, United States The arena opened in January 2023 and has a capacity of 2,600 spectators.

History
Despite being a NCAA Division I school, the UConn Huskies operated their ice hockey program at the Division III level for many years. During this time, the team's home rink was the UConn Ice Arena, an outdoor facility. The team was finally promoted to D-I in 1998 when the Mark Edward Freitas Ice Forum was completed. The Huskies used the Forum as their home for the next 18 years.

In 2014, UConn joined Hockey East despite the Ice Forum not meeting the league's requirements. The Huskies used the larger XL Center in nearby Hartford, Connecticut as a stop-gap measure while the decided on a permanent, on-campus solution.

In 2021, The athletic department settled on building a new rink across from the Freitas Ice Forum which was scheduled to be completed in time for the start of the 2022–23 season. The arena hosted its first UConn Women’s Hockey game on January 13, 2023 and its first UConn Men’s hockey game on January 14, 2023.

References

External links
 Official Site

UConn Huskies ice hockey
College ice hockey venues in the United States
Indoor ice hockey venues in the United States
Sports venues in Tolland County, Connecticut
UConn Huskies sports venues
2023 establishments in Connecticut